Maurice Tebbel (born 23 April 1994) is a German equestrian. He competed in the 2020 Summer Olympics.

References

1994 births
Living people
Equestrians at the 2020 Summer Olympics
German male equestrians
Olympic equestrians of Germany
German show jumping riders
20th-century German people
21st-century German people